"No Place Like Home" is a song written by Paul Overstreet and recorded by American country music artist Randy Travis. It was released in November 1986 as the fourth and final single from his album Storms of Life. The song reached #2 on the Billboard Hot Country Singles chart in March 1987.

Charts

Weekly charts

Year-end charts

References

1986 singles
Randy Travis songs
Songs written by Paul Overstreet
RPM Country Tracks number-one singles of the year
Song recordings produced by Kyle Lehning
Warner Records Nashville singles
1986 songs